Jim Henson Pictures was an American film studio owned by The Jim Henson Company and led by Brian and Lisa Henson. It was originally founded on July 21, 1995, by Brian Henson as a joint venture between Jim Henson Productions and Sony Pictures Entertainment.

The studio closed in 2004 as ended partnership with Brian Henson & Sony Pictures.

History 
Jim Henson Pictures was founded in 1995 by Brian Henson as the joint venture between Sony Pictures Entertainment and The Jim Henson Company.

Productions

See also 
 List of The Jim Henson Company films for films released by The Jim Henson Company

References 

Former The Jim Henson Company subsidiaries
Sony Pictures Entertainment
Film production companies of the United States
Joint ventures
American companies established in 1995
Entertainment companies established in 1995
American companies disestablished in 2004
Entertainment companies disestablished in 2004
American film studios
Former Sony subsidiaries